The Savage Six is the name of two different supervillain groups appearing in American comic books published by Marvel Comics.

Publication history
The Earth-982 version of the Savage Six first appeared in Spider-Girl #25 and was created by Tom DeFalco, Pat Olliffe, and Al Williamson.

The Earth-616 version of the Savage Six first appeared in Venom vol. 2 #17 and was created by Rick Remender, Cullen Bunn, Kev Walker, and Terry Pallot.

Fictional team history

Earth-982

In the MC2 universe, there was a group of Spider-Girl villains who banded together to defeat her. They called themselves the Savage Six, similar to the Sinister Six her father Spider-Man had faced.

The villain Funnyface gathered together Spider-Girl's enemies Dragon King, Killerwatt, Mr. Abnormal, and Sabreclaw. After breaking Raptor out of prison, the group becomes the Savage Six. The Savage Six begin to formulate a plan to destroy Spider-Girl when Funnyface's older brother Crazy Eight showed up to check up on Funnyface on his mother Angelface's behalf. Upon ignoring Crazy Eight's heckling, Funnyface formulated a plan to take hostages from Midville High School in order to draw out Spider-Girl. Sabreclaw and Mr. Abnormal abducted the students Jack Jameson and Courtney Duran while Raptor flew into the Daily Bugle so that they can alert Spider-Girl of the Savage Six's challenge to her. May "Mayday" Parker was present at the Daily Bugle at the time and left to change into Spider-Girl. Although Spider-Girl defeated Raptor, she learned that she would be forced to fight the other members of the Savage Six in a series of predetermined locations before she could save Jack Jameson and Courtney Duran. Spider-Girl was able to defeat Dragon King, Killerwatt, Mr. Abnormal, and Sabreclaw which one her the directions to Funnyface's headquarters. Spider-Girl received back-up from the Avengers and the Fantastic Five as Funnyface freaked out at the sight of them. Crazy Eight arrived at the scene and managed to knock out Funnyface so that the heroes can apprehend Funnyface.

Earth-616

In the Earth-616 reality, there are two different incarnations of the Savage Six:

Crime Master's Savage Six
The third Crime Master has created his own supervillain team called the Savage Six by assembling Death Adder I, the Human Fly I,  Jack O'Lantern V and Megatak upon offering them protection from the law and the Kingpin. Agent Venom was planning to take out the Crime Master III, only to be stopped by Eddie Brock. After a fight with Agent Venom, Jack O'Lantern V discovers Eddie Brock webbed up as the Crime Master III forcefully bonds Eddie Brock to the Toxin symbiote. The Savage Six targets the people Agent Venom cares about, including his family and Betty Brant.

Jack O'Lantern V in his human guise goes first and targets Betty Brant, only to end up fighting Agent Venom. During the fight, Megatak assists Jack O'Lantern V and punches Agent Venom's phone before he can make a call to the Avengers for help. While getting Betty away from Jack O'Lantern V and Megatak, Agent Venom is attacked by Toxin II (who is in full control of Eddie Brock). Agent Venom manages to use a sonic version of a pepper spray to immobilize Toxin II before getting away.

The Savage Six soon begins to target Betty Brant's family as Betty Brant and Agent Venom leave to go warn Betty's family. They arrive at the home of Betty's mother where they find Human Fly about to eat her. Megatak has also been monitoring the phone lines when it comes to the loved ones of Flash Thompson. Jack O'Lantern V then targets Jessie Thompson and ends up fighting Agent Venom. Agent Venom grabs Jack O'Lantern V's gun and fires on him before Jack O'Lantern V spews acid on him, causing Venom to cool down in the fountain. Although Agent Venom manages to get Jessie Thompson to safety, Toxin II manages to capture Betty Brant while the Human Fly I is eating the leftovers of what is supposedly Betty's mother.

Agent Venom continues to look for Betty and ends up killing Death Adder I after torturing the Human Fly I by ripping his wings off so that he can learn where the Crime Master III is located. When Betty is brought before the Crime Master III, she is shocked when the Crime Master reveals himself to be her brother Bennett Brant, who was thought dead after being killed upon being caught in the crossfire of the fight between Blackie Gaxton's group and Doctor Octopus.

When Agent Venom arrives at the Crime Master III's hideout, he defeats Megatak and severely burns Toxin II. Bennett Brant almost kills Agent Venom with a sonic pistol and a flamethrower, but he is shot and killed by Betty. When Agent Venom begins to make a comment on this, Betty states that her brother "died a long time ago."

Hunted version
In a prelude to the "Hunted" storyline, Kraven the Hunter had Taskmaster and the Black Ant apprehend King Cobra, Rhino, Scorpion, Stegron the Dinosaur Man, Tarantula, and Vulture where Arcade publicly branded them the next Savage Six. The Savage Six were present when Spider-Man became the latest catch for the Great Hunt and witness the arrival of the Hunter-Bots. The Savage Six then run from the Hunter-Bots when they begin their attack. Vulture lies to the rest of the Savage Six and the other animal-themed characters stating that the Gibbon sacrificed himself until Spider-Man arrives, where he exposes the truth about what happened to the Gibbon. The Savage Six lead the attack on the Hunter-Bots, where the destruction of one Hunter-Bot led to Bob's death due to the connection to the Hunter-Bot. This was all Kraven the Hunter's plan to punish the hunters for hunting animals for sport. The Savage Six and the animal-themed characters continue their attack on the Hunter-Bots. When Kraven the Hunter gives orders to Arcade to deactivate the force field surrounding Central Park, the Savage Six are among the animal-themed characters to get out. After the Great Hunt is over, Vulture tells King Cobra, Rhino, Scorpion, Stegron, and Tarantula that the Savage Six name has a good ring to it.

More recently, the Savage Six began hounding an action film project directed by a disguised Mysterio under the cooperation of Mary Jane Watson, an actress at the set, only to accidentally turn it into a smashing success.

During the "Sinister War" storyline, the Savage Six crash the world premiere of the movie that Mary Jane and a disguised Mysterio made. Despite Spider-Man's intervention, the attack gets crashed by the Sinister Six who are seeking to obtain Mysterio for their ranks resulting in a battle between both teams. Kindred kept the Savage Six on the reserve should Foreigner's group, the Superior Foes, and the Sinister Syndicate failed to eliminate Spider-Man. At the time when Spider-Man was badly wounded by the different groups, the Savage Six then attack the Sinister Six, giving Peter time to escape.

Members

Earth-982 membership
 Funny Face - Leader
 Dragon King
 Killerwatt
 Mr. Abnormal
 Raptor
 Sabreclaw

Earth-616 membership

First version
 Crime Master - Leader
 Death Adder
 Eddie Brock - Possessed by the Toxin symbiote
 Human Fly
 Jack O'Lantern
 Megatak

Second version
 Vulture - Leader
 King Cobra
 Rhino
 Scorpion
 Stegron
 Tarantula

See also
 Sinister Six
 Sinister Syndicate

References

External links
 Savage Six (MC2) at Marvel Wiki
 Savage Six (MC2) at Marvel Appendix
 Savage Six (Earth-616) at Marvel Wiki

Marvel Comics supervillain teams
Marvel Comics 2